Áine Ní Dhroigneáin is an Irish actress  who was formerly a regular on TG4 drama Ros na Rún.

Ní Dhroigneáin played Tara Ní Néill on the popular Irish language soap opera, first appearing in September 2005. She left the series in 2009. She first acted in a production of Snow White and the Seven Dwarves on stage in Bordeaux in 1996. Since then she has acted in a number of stage plays such as An Triail and Fear an Tae. She also participated in the 2006 season of You're a Star.

in 2010, she starred in an Irish-language short film, Nollaig Shona, which premiered at Times Square as a part of the New York City International Film Festival.

She lives in An Spidéal and is currently teaching french and english at Colaiste na Coiribe.

See also
 Ó Droighneáin

References

Year of birth missing (living people)
Living people
Irish soap opera actresses
Irish stage actresses
Irish television actresses
Actresses from County Galway
TG4 people
You're a Star contestants
20th-century Irish people
21st-century Irish people